Charles Herbert Percy Tupper (October 11, 1887 – May 18, 1950) was a Canadian politician. He served in the Legislative Assembly of British Columbia from 1933 to 1941  from the electoral district of Similkameen, a member of the British Columbia Liberal Party.

References

1887 births
1950 deaths
British Columbia Liberal Party MLAs
Politicians from London, Ontario